Dessau was one of the three Regierungsbezirke of Saxony-Anhalt, Germany, located in the east of the country.

History
Founded in 1990 from parts of Regierungsbezirk Halle, the Dessau government region was disbanded on January 1, 2004 . Its functions were taken over by the Landesverwaltungsamt, which has three offices at the former seats of the Bezirksregierungen.

Subdivision

Kreise(districts)
Anhalt-Zerbst
Bernburg
Bitterfeld
Köthen
Wittenberg

Kreisfreie Städte(district-free towns)
Dessau

See also
Bezirk Halle

Former states and territories of Saxony-Anhalt
States and territories established in 1990
States and territories disestablished in 2004
1990 establishments in Germany
2004 disestablishments in Germany
Former government regions of Germany